Saltillo Engine is a Chrysler engine plant in Ramos Arizpe, Coahuila, Mexico.  The factory opened in 1981. It was built as a scale model of the plant at Trenton, Michigan, United States, but with more work flexibility, having only 20 job classifications rather than the 70 at Trenton.

Current products:
 6.2 L Hemi Hellcat V8
 6.4 L Hemi Apache V8
 3.0 L Hurricane I6

Former products:
 Chrysler 5.9LA 1981-1992
 Chrysler 5.2 and 5.9 Magnum V8 1992-2002 5.2, 1993-2003 5.9
 Chrysler 8.0 Magnum V10 Truck 1994-2003
 Chrysler 5.7 Hemi V8 2003-2023
 2.0 L I4
 2.4 L I4
 2.4 L Tigershark I4

South Engine Plant 
Saltillo South Engine opened in 2010. It produces the 3.6 L Pentastar V6 engine.

References

Chrysler factories
Motor vehicle assembly plants in Mexico